Barreiros Parish may refer to:
 Barreiros Parish, Amares
 Barreiros Parish, Valpaços
 Barreiros Parish, Viseu